Euripides' Electra (Ēlektra) is a play probably written in the mid 410s BC, likely before 413 BC.  It is unclear whether it was first produced before or after Sophocles' version of the Electra story.

Background
Years before the start of the play, near the start of the Trojan War, the Greek general Agamemnon sacrificed his daughter Iphigeneia in order to appease the goddess Artemis. While his sacrifice allowed the Greek army to set sail for Troy, it led to a deep resentment in his wife, Clytemnestra. Upon Agamemnon's return from the Trojan War ten years later, Clytemnestra and her lover Aegisthus murdered him.

Plot
The play begins with the introduction of Electra, the daughter of Clytemnestra and the late Agamemnon. Several years after Agamemnon's death suitors began requesting Electra's hand in marriage. Out of fear that Electra's child might seek revenge, Clytemnestra and Aegisthus married her off to a peasant of Mycenae. The peasant is kind to her and has respected her family name and her virginity. In return for his kindness, Electra helps her husband with the household chores. Despite her appreciation for her husband's kindness, Electra resents being cast out of her house and laments to the Chorus about her struggles with her drastic change in social status.

Upon Agamemnon's murder Clytemnestra and Aegisthus put Orestes, the other child of Clytemnestra and Agamemnon, under the care of the king of Phocis, where he became friends with the king's son, Pylades. Now grown, Orestes and Pylades travel to Electra and her husband's house. Orestes keeps his identity hidden from Electra, claiming to be messengers of Orestes. He uses his anonymity to determine Electra's loyalty to him and Agamemnon before he reveals his plans for revenge. After some time it is clear that Electra is passionate about avenging the death of their father. At this point the aged servant who brought Orestes to Phocis years before enters the play. He recognizes Orestes because of the scar on his brow and the siblings are reunited.

They begin to plot how they will murder both Aegisthus and Clytemnestra. The aged servant explains that Aegisthus is currently in his stables, preparing to sacrifice oxen for a feast. Orestes goes to confront Aegisthus while Electra sends the aged servant to tell Clytemnestra that she had a son ten days ago, knowing this will bring Clytemnestra to her house. A messenger arrives and describes Orestes’ successful murder of Aegisthus. Orestes and Pylades return bearing Aegisthus’ body. As Clytemnestra approaches, Orestes begins to waver on his decision to murder their mother. Electra convinces Orestes that he must fulfill his duty to Agamemnon and murder their mother. When Clytemnestra arrives, Orestes and Electra lure her into the house, where they thrust a sword into her throat.

The two leave the house, filled with grief and guilt. As they lament, Clytemnestra's deified brothers, Castor and Pollux, appear. They tell Electra and Orestes that their mother received just punishment but their matricide was still a shameful act, and they instruct the siblings on what they must do to atone and purge their souls.

Aeschylean parody and Homeric allusion
The enduring popularity of Aeschylus' Oresteia trilogy (produced in 458 BC) is evident in Euripides' construction of the recognition scene between Orestes and Electra, which mocks Aeschylus' play. In The Libation Bearers (whose plot is roughly equivalent to the events in Electra), Electra recognizes her brother by a series of tokens: a lock of his hair, a footprint he leaves at Agamemnon's grave, and an article of clothing she had made for him years earlier. Euripides' own recognition scene clearly ridicules Aeschylus' account. In Euripides' play (510ff.), Electra laughs at the idea of using such tokens to recognize her brother because: there is no reason their hair should match; Orestes' footprint would in no way resemble her smaller footprint; and it would be illogical for a grown Orestes to still have a piece of clothing made for him when he was a small child.

Orestes is instead recognized from a scar he received on the forehead while chasing a doe in the house as a child (571-74). This is a mock-heroic allusion to a scene from Homer's Odyssey. In Odyssey 19.428-54, the nurse Eurycleia recognizes a newly returned Odysseus from a scar on his thigh that he received as a child while on his first boar hunt. In the Odyssey, Orestes' return to Argos and taking revenge for his father's death is held up several times as a model for Telemachus' behavior (see Telemachy). Euripides in turn uses his recognition scene to allude to the one in Odyssey 19. Instead of an epic heroic boar hunt, Euripides instead invents a semi-comic incident involving a fawn.

Translations
 Edward P. Coleridge, 1891 – prose: full text 
 Aurthur S. Way, 1896 – verse: full text
 Gilbert Murray, 1911 – verse: full text
 D. W. Lucas, 1951 – prose
Emily Townsend Vermeule, 1958 – verse
M. J. Cropp, 1988 – verse
J. Lembke & K.J. Reckford, 1994
 James Morwood, 1997 – prose
K. McLeish, 1997
J. Davie, 1998
J. Morwood, 1998
M. MacDonald and J. M. Walton, 2004 – verse
G. Theodoridis, 2006 – prose: full text
Ian C. Johnston, 2009 – verse: full text
 Brian Vinero, 2012: verse
Emily Wilson, 2016 - verse

Adaptations
Electra, 1962 film

References

Sources
 Arnott, W. G. 1993. "Double the Vision: A Reading of Euripides' Electra (1981)" In Greek Tragedy. Greece and Rome Studies, Volume II. Edited by Ian McAuslan and Peter Walcot. New York: Oxford University Press
 Gallagher, Robert L. 2003. "Making the Stronger Argument the Weaker: Euripides, Electra 518-41." Classical Quarterly 53.2: 401-415
Garner, R. 1990. From Homer to Tragedy: The Art of Allusion in Greek Poetry. London: Routledge.
 Garvie, Alexander F. 2012. "Three Different Electras in Three Different Plots." Lexis 30:283–293.
 Gellie, G. H. 1981. "Tragedy and Euripides’ Electra." Bulletin of the Institute of Classical Studies 28:1–12.
 Goff, Barbara. 1999–2000. "Try to Make it Real Compared to What? Euripides’ Electra and the Play of Genres." Illinois Classical Studies 24–25:93–105.
 Hammond, N. G. L. 1985. "Spectacle and Parody in Euripides’ Electra." Greek, Roman and Byzantine Studies 25:373–387.
 Morwood, J. H. W. 1981. "The Pattern of the Euripides Electra." American Journal of Philology 102:362–370.
 Mossman, Judith. 2001. "Women’s Speech in Greek Tragedy: The Case of Electra and Clytemnestra in Euripides’ Electra." Classical Quarterly n 51:374–384.
 Raeburn, David. 2000. "The Significance of Stage Properties in Euripides’ Electra." Greece & Rome 47:149–168.
Solmsen, F. 1967. Electra and Orestes: Three Recognitions in Greek Tragedy. Amsterdam: Noord-Hollandsche Uitgevers Mij.
Tarkow, T. 1981. "The Scar of Orestes: Observations on a Euripidean Innovation." Rheinisches Museum 124: 143-53.
 Wohl, Victoria. 2015. "How to Recognise a Hero in Euripides’ Electra." Bulletin of the Institute of Classical Studies 58:61–76.

External links

  
Textual criticism.  Theatre Database (online). 

Plays by Euripides
Trojan War literature
Mythology of Argolis
Plays set in ancient Greece
Greek plays adapted into films
Plays based on classical mythology